"Drink to Me Only with Thine Eyes" is a popular old song, the lyrics of which are the poem "To Celia" by the English playwright Ben Jonson, first published in 1616.

Lyrics

After this song had been popular for almost two centuries, scholars began to discern that its imagery and rhetoric were largely lifted from classical sources - particularly one of the erotic Epistles of Philostratus the Athenian (c. 170 – 250 AD). This borrowing is discussed by George Burke Johnston in his Poems of Ben Jonson (1960), who points out that "the poem is not a translation, but a synthesis of scattered passages. Although only one conceit is not borrowed from Philostratus, the piece is a unified poem, and its glory is Jonson's. It has remained alive and popular for over three hundred years, and it is safe to say that no other work by Jonson is so well known."<ref>George Burke Johnston, Poems of Ben Jonson (1960), "Introduction" p.xl. The author notes (p. 331) that while the authoritative proof of this borrowing was made by John Addington Symonds, in The Academy 16 (1884), a century earlier the dramatist Richard Cumberland had identified the link to "an obscure collection of love-letters" by Philostratus. (Richard Cumberland, The Observer: being a collection of moral, literary and familiar essays Volume 3 (Dublin: printed by Zachariah Jackson, for P. Byrne, R. Marchbank, J. Moore, and W. Jones, 1791), pp. 238-240.) The poet John F.M. Dovaston also discussed the borrowing in The Monthly Magazine of 1815, p. 123f.</ref>

Besides Philostratus, a couple of other classical precedents have also been identified.

This literary background helps restore the original intention of the words from the blurring of certain lyrical variations which, while naïvely touching, do conceal the true meaning. In particular, the line "But might I of Jove's nectar sup" is often rendered: "But might I of love's nectar sip". The disappearance of Jove was probably not due to changing fashion, however, but to a popular misreading of the text of early editions. In Ben Jonson's time the initial J was just coming into use, and previously the standard would have been to use a capital I (as in classical Latin). Thus in the first edition of Ben Johnson's The Forest (1616), where the song first appeared in print, the line reads: "But might I of Iove's nectar sup". "Iove" here indicates Jove, but this was misread as "love". The word "sup" has also often been changed to "sip"; but "sup" rhymes with "cup", and is clearly the reading in the first edition. The meaning of the line is that even if the poet could drink to his heart's content of the nectar of the king of the gods, he would prefer the nectar made by his earthly beloved.

Melody
Willa McClung Evans suggested that Jonson's lyrics were fitted to a tune already in existence and that the fortunate marriage of words to music accounted in part for its excellence. This seems unlikely since Jonson's poem was set to an entirely different melody in 1756 by Elizabeth Turner. Another conception is that the original composition of the tune was by John Wall Callcott in about 1790 as a glee for two trebles and a bass. It was arranged as a song in the 19th century, apparently by Colonel Mellish (1777–1817). Later arrangements include those by Granville Bantock and Roger Quilter. Quilter's setting was included in the Arnold Book of Old Songs, published in 1950.

Versions and uses
Sir Walter Scott used the tune for another song, "County Guy".
It appears as an arrangement by Theo Marzials in 'Pan pipes: A book of old songs' (1883).
The song was very frequently performed in American student musical performances in the 19th and 20th centuries. In liner notes, Johnny Cash states that this song was one of the early songs that he sang at a public engagement — at commencement exercise when a high school junior. (A version of the song was recorded privately by Cash at his home recording studio and released posthumously on the album Personal File.)  Cash previously recorded a song called "Drink to Me," loosely based on this song. 
 Kenneth Williams sings the song briefly in Carry on Screaming. The first stanza is sung in the second episode of The Onedin Line. Hyacinth Bucket (Patricia Routledge) drunkenly sings the song in episode 6, season 5 of Keeping Up Appearances.
 In 1926, Gwen Farrar (1899-1944) performed the song in a short film made in the Phonofilm sound-on-film process.
 The song is featured in the 1931 film Alexander Hamilton, as a love theme for Hamilton and his wife Betsey, who at one point sings it accompanying herself on the harpsichord.
The song features unflatteringly in the 1936 Merrie Melodies short subject I Love to Singa as the selection young "Owl Jolson's" parents force him to perform in his lessons rather than the title number much to his chagrin and dismay. Warner Bros., which distributed (and later produced) the Merrie Melodies series (and sister series Looney Tunes), later used this song as incidental music in the TV series Baby Looney Tunes, particularly when one of the characters is drinking milk, water or juice, or even pretending to drink tea.
The traditional choral version is sung in the 1938 film Boys Town (film) by the actual Boys Town A Cappella Chorus.
The song was performed by Paul Robeson on his album Ballad for Americans and Great Songs of Faith, Love and Patriotism, Vanguard Records.
The song was performed by Gloria Jean in the 1942 film Get Hep to Love.
The song is sung by the East Side Kids in a wedding scene in the 1943 film Ghosts on the Loose.
The song is sung in a comedic manner by Lou Costello in the 1946 Abbott & Costello film The Time of Their Lives.
Bing Crosby included the song in a medley on his album 101 Gang Songs (1961).
Duke Special recorded a version of the song as a B-Side for the single "Freewheel" with Neil Hannon of The Divine Comedy.
The song was performed by Swans on their album Various Failures. 
The song was used briefly in a 1986 episode of the TV series Tales from the Darkside.
Rabindranath Tagore, the Nobel Prize-winning poet from India, adapted the tune in his poem "Katabar Bhebechinu." A popular Bengali vocalist Swagatalakhsmi Dasgupta sang both the versions.
The song comes to the Martian Ylla in a dream in Ray Bradbury's Martian Chronicles (1950).
The song was performed by Sherwood in their album The Favourite Songs of Henry VIII.
Laura Wright recorded a version, featured on her album The Last Rose (2011).
George Eliot refers to this song in her novel The Mill on The Floss, Book 6, Chapter 13, as being sung by character Stephen Guest.
It is played in "A Fortunate Life" from the book by A B Facey made into a film (DVD) where the young Bert Facey woos his future wife.
African-American composer Florence Price included this melody as a movement in her "Negro Folksongs in Counterpoint" (1951) for string quartet.
 It was used in the movie "High Spirits", (1988) by the ghost Mary (Daryl Hannah), and attributed to Ben Jonson.
 It was used in the movie "Emma", (2020) sung as a duet by George Knightley (Johnny Flynn), and Jane Fairfax (Amber Anderson).
 it was heard on the original Animaniacs, Wakko's Wish, Histeria! and the new Animaniacs.
 Sheriff Hoot Kloot sings it briefly in the 1973 short "Ten Miles To The Gallop."
 A portion of the song is sung by Tyrone Power in a tavern in his 1936 breakout film, ‘’Lloyd’s of London.’’ The melody is occasionally used for certain scenes’ orchestral underscoring.
 It is sung by Major Robert Rogers (Spencer Tracy) and Langdon Towne (Robert Young) to encourage and cheer up the intoxicated Indian Cuncapot in the 1940 movie Northwest Passage.

References

 Oxford Companion to Music''
Choral Public Domain Library http://www.cpdl.org/wiki/index.php/Drink_to_me_only

External links

Recording and text of the poem, Poetry Foundation
Original 3 part glee composition by Callcott
Sheet music and midi for "Drink to me only with thine eyes"
Lyrics and midi arrangement
Four mixed voices composition by Kaiser

English folk songs
English poems
Songs based on poems
Jeanette MacDonald songs
Adaptations of works by Ben Jonson